Presidential elections were held in Kazakhstan on 10 January 1999. Incumbent president Nursultan Nazarbayev won the election with over 80% of the vote, and was sworn into office on 20 January 1999. Most observers viewed the election as blatantly unfair, further confirming that Nazarbayev was not interested in promoting a democratic system of government. Voter turnout was reported to be 87%.

Background
Kazakhstan's second presidential election was originally scheduled to occur in 1996. However, after a 1995 referendum the date was then set to be in December 2000. Parliamentary action in the fall of 1998, however, ultimately resulted in the election occurring in early 1999.

On 7 October 1998 nineteen amendments to the constitution were passed by Parliament and signed into law by President Nazarbayev. One amendment to article 94 read: "By consent of the President of the Republic of Kazakhstan the present term of the powers of the President of the Republic may be reduced by resolution of the Parliament of the Republic, adopted at the joint session of its Chambers by the majority of votes of the total number of deputies of each Chamber. In such case the Mäjilis of the Parliament within one month shall order elections of the President of the Republic of Kazakhstan."

Acting under this new amendment, the following day Parliament asked Nazarbayev to shorten his current term in office. The president agreed, after which the Mäjilis set 10 January 1999 as the date for new elections.

The main opposition candidate, Akezhan Kazhegeldin, was barred from running in the election, a move criticized by many observers. A recently passed law prohibited anyone convicted of a crime from running in the election. Kazhegeldin had recently been convicted of participating in an unsanctioned election rally, thereby becoming ineligible to seek office.

Conduct
Even before the election, groups such as the Organization for Security and Co-operation in Europe (OSCE) expressed concern about the short preparation and campaigning period. OSCE pressed the Kazakh government to postpone the election so that all candidates could have adequate time to campaign, but to no avail. U.S. vice president Al Gore called Nazarbayev in November 1998 to express concerns about the upcoming election.

The lack of fair access to mass media also concerned many observers. According to OSCE, most major media outlets focused disproportionately on Nazarbayev.

Serikbolsyn Abdildin, the runner-up in the election, claimed widespread voter fraud and a failure to properly count ballots.

The U.S. Department of State commented that the undemocratic nature of the elections "cast a shadow on bilateral relations".

Results
Nazarbayev's party, the Party of People's Unity of Kazakhstan, was reformed into the Otan Party two months after the elections.

References

Kazakhstan
Presidential election
Presidential elections in Kazakhstan
Kazakhstan